Bezhuda is a rural locality (a selo) in Nachadinsky Selsoviet, Tlyaratinsky District, Republic of Dagestan, Russia. The population was 32 as of 2010.

Geography 
Bezhuda is located 33 km northeast of Tlyarata (the district's administrative centre) by road. Tinchuda is the nearest rural locality.

References 

Rural localities in Tlyaratinsky District